Edward Evelyn (born 27 December 1864, date of death unknown) was a Barbadian cricketer. He played in one first-class match for the Barbados cricket team in 1883/84.

See also
 List of Barbadian representative cricketers

References

External links
 

1864 births
Year of death missing
Barbadian cricketers
Barbados cricketers
People from Christ Church, Barbados